The Lion City Cup, is an annual international association football competition organized by the Football Association of Singapore, contested by the Under-16 soccer teams.  It was founded in 1977 as the only Under-16 soccer tournament in the world. It helped in the creation of a FIFA U-16 World Championship in China in 1985 at FIFA's request.

Past winners

References

External links
 RSSSF: Lion City Cup (Singapore)
 http://www.indianfootball.de/specials/india/indianteam/1999lionscup.html
 http://www.indianfootball.de/specials/india/indianteam/1998lionscup.html
 RSSSF: 18th Lion City Cup (2001)
 RSSSF: 19th Lion City Cup (2004)
 RSSSF: 20th Lion City Cup (2005)
 ASEAN Football: Thailand clinch Lion City Cup
 ESPN FC Asia: Tottenham crowned Lion City Cup champions with 4-0 win over Liverpool

Under-16 association football
Football competitions in Singapore